Chung King Law (born 31 August 1947;also known as Ed Law) is a Chinese-born American scientist and a Robert H. Goddard professor at Princeton University. He is a specialist in the combustion science.

Career and research
Law received his bachelors and masters degree, respectively from University of Alberta and University of Toronto. He completed his PhD in 1973 under the supervision of Forman A. Williams at University of California San Diego. He worked at the General Motors Research Laboratories for two years and briefly at the Princeton University before joining the faculty at the Northwestern University in 1976. He joined the faculty of University of California Davis in 1984 and left in 1988, to join the faculty at Princeton University, where he is currently the Robert H. Goddard professor.

Law has made several contributions to the combustion field, especially, in connection with droplet dynamics and burning.

Books

Honors and awards
Law holds many honors and awards. He is an elected fellow of ASME (1989), AIAA (1992), Combustion Institute. and APS (2006).

 Silver Combustion Medal (1990) from The Combustion Institute
 Alfred C. Egerton Gold Medal (2006) from The Combustion Institute
 Pendray Aerospace Literature Award (2004) from AIAA

The journal Combustion and Flame issued a special issue commemerating Law's 70th birthday in 2018.

References

External links
 

1947 births
University of Toronto alumni
Fluid dynamicists
Living people
University of California, San Diego alumni
Fellows of The Combustion Institute
Fellows of the American Physical Society